The USSR Super Cup, also known as the Season's Cup, was an unofficial exhibition game (or game series) not sanctioned by the Football Federation of the Soviet Union and that featured the winners of the previous season's Soviet Top League and USSR Cup in a one- or two-legged playoff for the trophy.

History
The mini-tournament was conducted on the initiative of the Komsomolskaya Pravda editor's administration out of Moscow. The tournament was unofficial and never was part of the Football Federation of the Soviet Union. It was played seven times in the last 15 years of Soviet football. It was not until 1983 that the Super Cup was played every year. The Super Cup was made to take place during midseason and further complicated clubs' schedules.

In 1987, with Spartak Moscow winning league honors and Dynamo Kyiv winning the USSR Cup, the Super Cup match was scheduled to take place in Chişinău, Moldova. However, the match never took place because of inadequate facilities in Chişinău. The last USSR Super Cup took place in Sochi, Russia, where the match was played in front of 1,500 fans.

Finals by year

1977 Season's Cup

1981 Season's Cup

1984 Season's Cup, consisted out of two games

Shakhtar won the Cup play-off 3-2

1985 Season's Cup, consisted out of two games

Zenit won the Cup play-off 3-1

1986 USSR Super Cup

1987 USSR Super Cup

1988 USSR Super Cup

1989 USSR Super Cup

Winners by year

Performance by club

Performance by republic

See also
National super cups of former Soviet republics:
 Armenian Supercup
 Azerbaijan Supercup
 Belarusian Super Cup
 Estonian Supercup
 Georgian Super Cup
 Kazakhstan Super Cup
 Latvian Supercup
 Lithuanian Supercup
 Moldovan Super Cup
 Russian Super Cup
 Ukrainian Super Cup
 Super Cup of Champions

References
 USSR (Soviet Union) - List of Super Cup Finals, rsssf.com. Accessed on June 9, 2006.
 Well Forgotten Past, nevskoevremya.spb.ru. Accessed on June 9, 2006.

Notes

 
Super Cup
Soviet Union
1977 establishments in the Soviet Union
1989 disestablishments in the Soviet Union